BKD may refer to

Bacterial kidney disease, a systemic infection in wild salmonoid fish
Bankard, one of the largest credit card issuers in the Philippines (stock symbol BKD)
Bharatiya Kranti Dal, an Indian political party active from 1967 to 1977
BKD, LLP, one of the largest U.S. accounting and advisory firms
BKD tree, a tree data structure for subdividing a k-dimensional search space in computer science
Blakedown railway station, Worcestershire, England (station code BKD)
Brookdale Senior Living, an American operator of retirement communities (stock symbol BKD)
Bukid language, an Austronesian language of the Philippines (ISO 639-3 code BKD)
Stephens County Airport in Breckenridge, Texas (IATA code BKD)